Polisi is a mountain range in Elbasan County, central Albania. It stretches along the upper valley of the Shkumbin river. Polisi reaches an elevation of 1,974 m (6,476 ft) above sea level at its highest peak, Fage e Madhe. Another peak of the massif is Mali Plak, which reaches an elevation of 1,943 m (6,375 ft) above sea level.

In classical antiquity it was a central mountain range in southern Illyria, and was known as Kandavia (Kandauia) or Candaviae Montes (Candauiae Montes). It likely gave the name to the part of Via Egnatia that followed the convergence of its two branches from Dyrrhachium and Apollonia, which was attested as "επί Κανδαουίας" (epí Kandaouías) in Strabo's Geography.

References

Citations

Bibliography 

Geography of Elbasan County
Mountains of Albania
Illyrian Albania